Archaeomeryx is an extinct genus of ruminant that lived early in the Eocene. It is believed to be close to the ancestry of the group Pecora, which includes deer, giraffes, cows and their relatives. Unlike the modern members of this group, it had a set of functioning incisors in the upper jaw. It was small in size, comparable to a modern-day mouse deer. It was also very rabbit-like and had several distinctive characteristics. It lived in present-day China 35 to 40 million years ago.

References

 The Beginning of the Age of Mammals by Kenneth Rose

Prehistoric cervoids
Eocene even-toed ungulates
Fossils of China
Prehistoric even-toed ungulate genera